Richard Steven Sila (born 4 January 1998) is a French professional footballer who plays as a winger.

Career
Sila made his first team debut for Paris FC in a 2–1 Coupe de la Ligue win over Sochaux on 13 August 2019. On 22 October 2019, he signed his first professional contract with Paris FC.

In January 2020, Sila joined Andrézieux on loan until the end of the 2019–20 season. In October 2020 he joined Concarneau on loan until the end of the 2020–21 season.

Personal life
Born in France, Sila is of Congolese descent.

References

External links
 
 
 UNFP Profile
 Anciens AJA Profile

1998 births
Living people
Footballers from Essonne
French footballers
French sportspeople of Democratic Republic of the Congo descent
Black French sportspeople
Association football forwards
Paris FC players
Andrézieux-Bouthéon FC players
US Concarneau players
Ligue 2 players
Championnat National players
Championnat National 2 players
Championnat National 3 players
Liga I players
FC Botoșani players
AFC Chindia Târgoviște players
French expatriate footballers
French expatriate sportspeople in Romania
Expatriate footballers in Romania